Christopher Matthew Mueller (born August 29, 1996) is an American professional soccer player who plays as a winger for Major League Soccer club Chicago Fire and the United States national team.

Following a collegiate career at the University of Wisconsin–Madison, Mueller was the sixth overall pick of the 2018 MLS SuperDraft, joining Orlando City where he became the club's all-time leading appearance maker during a four-season spell. Mueller joined Scottish club Hibernian in January 2022, but left them after four months and returned to the MLS with Chicago Fire.

Club career

Youth and college
Mueller grew up in Schaumburg, Illinois and played college soccer at the University of Wisconsin from 2014 to 2017, scoring 22 goals in 75 regular season matches. In 2016, Mueller was selected to the All-America third-team and the All-Big Ten first team. In 2017, Mueller was named Big Ten Offensive Player of the Year, as well as being selected to the All-Big Ten first team and the All-America second-team.

Orlando City
Mueller was drafted as the sixth overall pick of the 2018 MLS SuperDraft by Orlando City SC. He made his professional debut on March 3, 2018, in a season-opening 1–1 draw with D.C. United. On April 8, 2018, Mueller scored his first professional goal against Portland Timbers in a 3–2 victory. On April 21, 2018, Mueller scored the fastest goal in Orlando City history when he scored 63 seconds into a match against the San Jose Earthquakes, and later in the match he recorded his first professional assist. Mueller was runner-up for the 2018 MLS Rookie of the Year Award.

On March 2, 2019, Mueller started in his second consecutive season opener, scoring in a 2–2 against New York City FC. He scored his first U.S. Open Cup goal against the same opposition on July 10, 2019, in a 1–1 quarter-final draw before Orlando progressed to their first ever semi-final on penalties. In July 2019, Mueller was part of the Orlando City team alongside Nani and Sebas Méndez that won the 2019 MLS All-Star Skills Challenge, beating teams from the MLS All-Stars and Atlético Madrid to win the $25,000 prize for charity with Mueller notably the only player to successfully complete a scissors kick during the volleys round.

On March 7, 2020, Mueller scored Orlando's first goal of the season in a 2–1 away loss to Colorado Rapids. With the season affected by the coronavirus pandemic, a return to play was achieved through the MLS is Back Tournament. Mueller scored in the opening game as Orlando beat newly formed rivals Inter Miami CF 2–1 before scoring a brace in the following game, a 3–1 victory over New York City FC. He finished the 2020 season as the team's top scorer with a career-high 10 goals.

On July 17, 2021, Mueller appeared as a substitute in 1–1 draw with Toronto FC. It was his 108th appearance for the club in all competitions, tying the record set by Cristian Higuita in 2019. Entering the final year of his contract in 2021, Mueller had been in contract negotiations with Orlando City but informed the club on July 21, 2021, that he had signed a pre-contract agreement with an unnamed European club and that he would be leaving upon the expiry of his contract at the end of the 2021 season. He broke the club appearance record a day later, starting in a 2–1 win over Philadelphia Union.

Hibernian
On July 22, 2021, Scottish Premiership side Hibernian announced they had signed Mueller on a free transfer agreement, which would see him join the club on January 1, 2022.

On January 20, 2022, Mueller made his debut for Hibernian in the side's 1–0 win over Cove Rangers in the Scottish Cup. On February 13, 2022, He scored his first goal for the club in a 3–1 win over Arbroath F.C. in the Scottish Cup. This proved to be the only goal Mueller would score for Hibs, and he was allowed to return to the US in May 2022. Hibs chief executive Ben Kensell said that Mueller had struggled to "adapt to the pace and physicality" of Scottish football.

Chicago Fire
On May 5, 2022, MLS side Chicago Fire FC announced they had signed Mueller for an undisclosed fee from Hibernian.

International career
In November 2020, having never appeared on any level for the United States national team, Mueller was called up to the United States senior team for a friendly against El Salvador. He made his debut starting the game on December 9, scoring twice, registering one assist and was named man of the match in a 6–0 victory.

Career statistics

Club

International 

 As of match played December 9, 2020. United States score listed first, score column indicates score after each Mueller goal.

References

External links

1996 births
Living people
People from Schaumburg, Illinois
Association football forwards
Wisconsin Badgers men's soccer players
Chicago FC United players
Orlando City SC players
Orlando City SC draft picks
USL League Two players
Major League Soccer players
Soccer players from Illinois
Sportspeople from Cook County, Illinois
American soccer players
Des Moines Menace players
United States men's international soccer players
Hibernian F.C. players
Scottish Professional Football League players
Chicago Fire FC players